A firelighter is a small, solid fuel tablet for fire making. Firelighters marketed as consumer products may be used to start a wood or coal fire in a fireplace, wood-burning stove, or solid-fuel portable stove.

As a hazardous material, firelighters are assigned a UN number: 2623 ("Firelighters; solid with flammable liquid").

See also
 Hexamine fuel tablet

References

Camping equipment
Firelighting materials
Solid fuels